Tomás Martínez Guerrero (21 December 1820 – 12 March 1873) was the President of Nicaragua between 15 November 1857 and 1 March 1867. From 24 June 1857 to 19 October or 15 November 1857, he acted jointly as the 2nd President in a dual Junta with the Liberal Máximo Jerez formed on 23 January.

He was born in Nagarote, son of Joaquín Martínez and María Guerrero Mora. He was put in power by the other Central American countries after they drove out William Walker in 1857. His main task as President was to restore order following the civil war. A member of the Conservative Party, he began a period of 35 years of conservative rule in Nicaragua.

He died in León, Nicaragua.

References

1820 births
1873 deaths
People from León Department
Presidents of Nicaragua
Conservative Party (Nicaragua) politicians
19th-century Nicaraguan people